Casa d'Areny-Plandolit  is a historical mansion located in Ordino, Andorra. It is a heritage property registered in the Cultural Heritage of Andorra. It was built in 1633.

See also

 Guillem d'Areny-Plandolit
 History of Andorra

References

External links

 Museu Casa d'Areny-Plandolit  Ministry of Culture, Government of Andorra 

Ordino
Houses in Andorra
Houses completed in 1633
Cultural Heritage of Andorra
Museums in Andorra
1633 establishments in Europe